Sergey Grigorievich Belikov (born October 25, 1954, in Krasnogorsk) is a Russian singer, musician, composer and Honored Artist of Russia (1999).

References

External links
 Official Website
 

1954 births
Living people
Soviet male singers
Soviet pop singers
Russian pop singers
People from Krasnogorsk, Moscow Oblast
Singers from Moscow
Honored Artists of the Russian Federation
Russian bass guitarists
Male bass guitarists
20th-century Russian male singers
20th-century Russian singers
21st-century Russian male singers
21st-century Russian singers